Omkaram is a 1997 Indian Telugu-language action film directed by Upendra making his directorial debut in Telugu. The film stars Dr. Rajasekhar, Prema and Bhagyashree. The film was a remake of director's own 1995 Kannada film Om with Prema reprising her role in the remake. The Telugu version was an average success in comparison to the original Kannada version.

Cast
Dr. Rajasekhar as Satya
Prema as Madhu
Bhagyashree as Shashi
J. V. Somayajulu as Satya's father
Upendra as the narrator of the first scene

Soundtrack

The soundtrack was composed by Hamsalekha who also composed the songs for the original Kannada version . He retained three songs from the original while the fourth one was from one of his earlier Kannada movie.

The film retained three songs from the original film. While the song Om Brahmanda which comes in the place of Hey Dinakara retained only the opening Sanskrit verse from the original version and was followed by the tune of another Kannada song by Hamsalekha - Eke Heegaytho from the 1988 Kannada movie Anjada Gandu.

Telugu version 

"College Kurrodu" - Mano
"O Gulabi" - S. P. Balasubrahmanyam
"Bullemma" - Mano
"Dilruba" - S. P. Balasubrahmanyam
"Om Brahmanda" - S. P. Balasubrahmanyam

Tamil version 

"College Student" - Mano
"O Rojave" - S. P. Balasubrahmanyam
"Kanne Vaa" - Devi
"Om Brahmananda" - S. P. Balasubrahmanyam
"I Love You" - S. P. Balasubrahmanyam

References

External links

1997 films
1990s Telugu-language films
Telugu remakes of Kannada films
Films scored by Hamsalekha
Films about organised crime in India
1990s crime action films
Indian crime action films
Films directed by Upendra